Kalahu (also Romanized as Kalāhū, Kolahoo, and Kolāhū) is a village in Gafr and Parmon Rural District, Gafr and Parmon District, Bashagard County, Hormozgan Province, Iran. At the 2006 census, its population was 26, in 7 families.

References 

Populated places in Bashagard County